Daniel Miller (born May 30, 1942) is an American politician from the state of Florida. A Republican, he represented the state and its 13th district in the House of Representatives for ten years.

Early life and career

Miller was born in Highland Park, Michigan, but moved to Florida during his childhood and graduated from Manatee High School in Bradenton, Florida, in 1960. He was an undergraduate at the University of Florida, Gainesville, and received his MBA from Emory University. He then got his Ph.D. and served as a professor at several colleges across the South.  He also developed a successful business career, working with his father Don Sr. and brother Don Jr. on a restaurant, nursing home and real estate development.  In 1992, Miller ran for Congress in Florida's 13th congressional district, a newly-created district that included all of Manatee and Sarasota Counties, along with the southern portion of Hillsborough and a sliver of Charlotte.

Miller was elected to the U.S. House from the Republican-leaning district and served for the following ten years. He decided not to run for re-election in 2002, honoring his self-imposed term limit of 10 years. Florida Secretary of State Katherine Harris was elected to succeed him.

In Congress, Miller advocated spending restraint as a fiscal conservative.  He served on several committees during his tenure, including Appropriations, Government Reform & Oversight, and Budget.  Miller championed Medicare reform, fought to end the costly sugar subsidy, and opposed earmarking.  Miller also served as chairman of the subcommittee on the United States Census, overseeing the 2000 decennial census, a position he was uniquely qualified to hold as a former statistics professor.

Electoral history

*Write-in and minor candidate notes:  In 1994 and 1998, Miller was unopposed, and so a vote total was not recorded.  In 1996, write-ins received 135 votes.  In 2000, write-ins received 101 votes.

References

External links
 Entry in the Congressional Biographical Dictionary
 

University of Florida alumni
1942 births
Living people
Republican Party members of the United States House of Representatives from Florida
21st-century American politicians